Club de Futbol Amposta is a Spanish football team based in Amposta, in the autonomous community of Catalonia. Founded in 1915, it plays in Primera Catalana, holding home games at Estadi Municipal de Amposta, which has a capacity of 3,000 spectators.

Season to season

11 seasons in Tercera División

External links
Official website 
Futbolme team profile 

Football clubs in Catalonia
Association football clubs established in 1915
Divisiones Regionales de Fútbol clubs
1915 establishments in Spain